El Marañón is a corregimiento in Soná District, Veraguas Province, Panama with a population of 2,322 as of 2010. Its population as of 1990 was 2,126; its population as of 2000 was 2,275.

References

Corregimientos of Veraguas Province